Eugene Daniel (born 1961) is an American football player.

Eugene Daniel may also refer to:

Eugene Daniel, a 1921 lynching victim

See also